Lindsay Davenport and Natasha Zvereva were the defending champions but lost in the final 7–5, 6–4 against Martina Hingis and Mirjana Lučić.

Seeds
Champion seeds are indicated in bold text while text in italics indicates the round in which those seeds were eliminated.

 Lindsay Davenport /  Natasha Zvereva (final)
 Patricia Tarabini /  Caroline Vis (first round)
 Naoko Kijimuta /  Nana Miyagi (first round)
 Elena Likhovtseva /  Ai Sugiyama (semifinals)

Draw

External links
 1998 Toray Pan Pacific Open Doubles Draw

Pan Pacific Open
Toray Pan Pacific Open - Doubles
1998 Toray Pan Pacific Open